Elkin Orlando Serrano Valero (Bogotá, Colombia, March 17, 1984) is a Colombian footballer who plays as a centre back for Victoria Hotspurs in Malta.

Career

Nadur Youngsters
Ahead of the 2019-20 season, Serrando joined Nadur Youngsters in Malta.

References

External links

1984 births
Living people
Footballers from Bogotá
Colombian footballers
Academia F.C. players
La Equidad footballers
Águilas Doradas Rionegro players
Cúcuta Deportivo footballers
Atlético Bucaramanga footballers
Alianza Petrolera players
Balzan F.C. players
Nadur Youngsters F.C. players
Colombian expatriate footballers
Expatriate footballers in Malta
Colombian expatriate sportspeople in Malta
Association football defenders